"When Will You Say I Love You" is a song by English singer Billy Fury, released as a single in May 1963. It peaked at number 3 on the Record Retailer Top 50.

Release and reception
"When Will You Say I Love You" was written by Alan Fielding, who had previously written another Fury hit "Last Night Was Made for Love". The B-side, "All I Wanna Do Is Cry" was written by David Battaglia and Johnny Brandon and had originally been released by America  R&B singer Billy Bland in January 1962.

Reviewing for Disc, Don Nicholl wrote that "When Will You Say I Love You" "opens as if it's going to be a fast piano concerto. But soon slides into a familiar lazy beat for another hit ballad", with Fury singing "the lyrics romantically with those undertones of Presley which seem to be doing him a lot of good commercially nowadays". In New Record Mirror, it was described as "a good song with a good tune and a very good lyric. Medium tempo, with a different approach that seems fresh for a change".

Track listing
7": Decca / F 11655
 "When Will You Say I Love You" – 2:24
 "All I Wanna Do Is Cry" – 2:15

Charts

References

1963 singles
1963 songs
Decca Records singles
Billy Fury songs
Song recordings produced by Mike Smith (British record producer)